Nestoras Stefanidis (born 13 April 1984) is a Greek footballer who plays for Agrotikos Asteras in the Gamma Ethniki as a centre forward.

Club career 
Stefanidis started his career in the club of his hometown Kilkisiakos. After a short spell for Akratitos he returned to Kilkisiakos. After playing for Kastoria and Agrotikos Asteras in July 2012 he signed for Iraklis. He debuted for his new club in the opening match of the season. He scored his first goal in an away win against Ergotelis on 20 October 2012. In August 2013 he moved to AEL. He played for almost 1.5 years and scored 22 goals in the Football League 2 championship, being a key player to the team's promotion in the second category. In January 2015 he signed once again with Agrotikos Asteras.

References

External links 
Player profile in Iraklis F.C. Official website 
Move to AEL 1964

1984 births
Living people
Greek footballers
Kastoria F.C. players
Panserraikos F.C. players
Iraklis Thessaloniki F.C. players
Association football forwards
Footballers from Kilkis